Amirlu (also Romanized as Amīrlū and Amir Loo) is a village in Zarrineh Rud Rural District, Bizineh Rud District, Khodabandeh County, Zanjan Province, Iran. At the 2006 census, its population was 547, in 97 families.

References 

Populated places in Khodabandeh County